Gerson Pereira dos Santos Filho (born June 15, 1982) is a Brazilian retired footballer.

Career

College and amateur
Dos Santos played for several youth clubs in his native Brazil, including C.A. Juventus and Foz Cataratas E.C., before moving to the United States in 2005 to attend and play college soccer at Virginia Commonwealth University. He made 45 appearances with the VCU Rams over three seasons, scoring 10 goals and 9 assists, earning All-CAA First Team honors in his sophomore season, and being named co-Player of the Year in his senior year.

Dos Santos also spent the 2007 season with Richmond Kickers Future in the USL Premier Development League.

Professional
Dos Santos graduated from college one year early and turned professional in 2009 when he signed with the Richmond Kickers in the USL Second Division. He made his professional debut on April 18, 2009 in Richmond's 2-2 opening day tie with the Harrisburg City Islanders, and helped the Kickers to the 2009 USL Second Division championship.

Coaching
In addition to his playing career, Dos Santos managed many youth teams. Notably, the 2013-15 U14-15 Richmond Kickers Central Everton team was successful in creating many great soccer players of the future.

Honors

Richmond Kickers
USL Second Division Champions (1): 2009

References

External links
Richmond Kickers bio 
VCU bio

1982 births
Living people
Brazilian footballers
Brazilian expatriate footballers
VCU Rams men's soccer players
Richmond Kickers Future players
Richmond Kickers players
USL League Two players
USL Second Division players
USL Championship players
Expatriate soccer players in the United States
Association football midfielders
Major Indoor Soccer League (2008–2014) players
Footballers from São Paulo